Calosoma himalayanum is a species of ground beetle in the subfamily of Carabinae. It was described by Gestro in 1875.

References

himalayanum
Beetles described in 1875